"Waiting" is a song by American rock band Green Day. It was released as the third single from their sixth album, Warning, and is the tenth track. The song peaked at number 26 on the Billboard Modern Rock chart.

The melody of the song is somewhat similar to that of "Do You Wanna Dance?" by Bobby Freeman as well as Nirvana's "Drain You" and Petula Clark's "Downtown".

The song also appeared as the 20th track on their International Superhits! in 2001.

Reception
The song was also well received by critics. NME, in its review, stated that "'Waiting', with its Mamas And Papas melody and its Kiss Army hook, could sit respectably alongside the band's best material." Slant called the song "instantly memorable."

Music video
The video features Green Day playing in a house while a bunch of young adults are jumping around, breaking various items and having a party (in slow motion). It was directed by Marc Webb.

Track listing
CD
"Waiting" (album version) – 3:13
"Macy's Day Parade" (live) – 4:26
"Basket Case" (live) – 2:49
"Waiting" (Video) – 3:23

 Track 2 also available on ...Tune In, Tokyo.
 Track 3 also available on Bowling Bowling Bowling Parking Parking.

GER CD
"Waiting" – 3:13
"She" (live) – 2:32
"F.O.D." (live) – 3:07

DVD Single
"Waiting" (album version) – 3:13
"Waiting" (Video) – 3:23
4 x video snippets: "Basket Case" / "Geek Stink Breath" / "Good Riddance (Time of Your Life)" / "Minority" – 2:30

7"

Side A
"Waiting" – 3:13

Side B
"Maria" – 2:27

Vinyl box set version

Side A
"Waiting" – 3:13
"Macy's Day Parade" – 3:34

Side B
"Fashion Victim" – 2:59
"Castaway" – 4:01

Chart positions

References

2001 singles
Green Day songs
Songs written by Billie Joe Armstrong
Music videos directed by Marc Webb
2000 songs
Reprise Records singles
Songs written by Mike Dirnt
Songs written by Tré Cool
American pop songs